Kirill Gerassimenko (born 18 December 1996) is a Kazakhstani table tennis player. He competed at the 2016 Summer Olympics in the men's singles event, in which he was eliminated in the first round by Ádám Pattantyús.

References

1996 births
Living people
Kazakhstani male table tennis players
Olympic table tennis players of Kazakhstan
Table tennis players at the 2016 Summer Olympics
Table tennis players at the 2020 Summer Olympics
Table tennis players at the 2014 Summer Youth Olympics
Table tennis players at the 2014 Asian Games
Asian Games competitors for Kazakhstan
21st-century Kazakhstani people